The Washington Toll Bridge Authority was created in 1937 by the Washington State Legislature, with a mandate to finance, construct and operate toll bridges.

The first act of the Authority was to purchase the Manette Bridge, previously a privately owned toll bridge. The Authority next began construction of the Lake Washington Floating Bridge and the Tacoma Narrows Bridge.  Bonds on the bridges were to be paid off solely by tolls and did not constitute indebtedness for the state of Washington.

The Lake Washington Floating Bridge opened in July 1940 with a toll, which was lifted in 1943 after bridge costs had been recovered.  The Tacoma Narrows Bridge, which also opened in July 1940, earned the name Galloping Gertie when it collapsed during a heavy windstorm on November 7, 1940.

References

Bridges in Washington (state)
Toll Bridge Authority
Toll bridges in Washington (state)
Toll road authorities of the United States